Hiller B. Zobel  is a retired Associate Justice of the Superior Court of Massachusetts and author or coauthor of several books on various legal topics, including the Boston Massacre and John Adams. He graduated from Harvard College in 1953 and received his law degree in 1959 from Harvard. He was recalled from retirement in 2006 to serve on the Middlesex Superior Court. 

Some of the legal tasks in which he played a significant role include:
 Judge at the murder trial of Louise Woodward, British au pair in 1997.
 Libel counsel for WCVB-TV
 Professor at Boston College Law School.

Selected publications
 Zobel, Hiller B., The Boston Massacre (1970) (reissued 1995), W. W. Norton and Co., .
 Zobel, Hiller B., Rous, Stephen N., Doctors and the Law: Defendants and Expert Witnesses (1993), W. W. Norton & Company, .
 Wroth, L. Kinvin (editor), Zobel, Hiller B. (editor), Legal Papers of John Adams (3 vols) (1965), Harvard University

External links

Living people
Massachusetts state court judges
Boston College faculty
Harvard Law School alumni
American male writers
Harvard College alumni
Year of birth missing (living people)